Mount Olive is a town in Duplin and Wayne counties in the U.S. state of North Carolina. The population was 4,589 at the 2010 census. It is included in the Goldsboro, North Carolina Metropolitan Statistical Area. The town is home to the Mt. Olive Pickle Company and the University of Mount Olive.

History
The Mount Olive High School (Former), Mount Olive Historic District, Perry-Cherry House, Southerland-Burnette House, former United States Post Office, and Vernon are listed on the National Register of Historic Places.

Geography
Mount Olive is located in southern Wayne County at  (35.195086, -78.067528). A small portion of the town extends south into Duplin County.

U.S. Route 117, a four-lane highway, runs along the western edge of Mount Olive, leading north  to Goldsboro and south  to Warsaw. North Carolina Highway 55, which crosses US 117 at the northern end of town, leads east  to Kinston and west  to Newton Grove.

Mount Olive is part of the Atlantic coastal plain region.

Demographics

2020 census

As of the 2020 United States census, there were 4,198 people, 1,803 households, and 985 families residing in the town.

2000 census
As of the census of 2000, there were 4,567 people, 1,770 households, and 1,125 families residing in the town. The population density was 1,819.3 people per square mile (702.5/km2). There were 2,012 housing units at an average density of 801.5 per square mile (309.5/km2). The racial makeup of the town was 82.98% White, 12.30% African American, 0.15% Native American, 0.15% Asian, 0.11% Pacific Islander, 1.34% from other races, and 0.96% from two or more races. Hispanic or Latino of any race were 3.17% of the population.

There were 1,770 households, out of which 25.9% had children under the age of 18 living with them, 36.8% were married couples living together, 22.9% had a female householder with no husband present, and 36.4% were non-families. 32.3% of all households were made up of individuals, and 15.8% had someone living alone who was 65 years of age or older. The average household size was 2.38 and the average family size was 3.01.

In the town, the population was spread out, with 22.9% under the age of 18, 14.0% from 18 to 24, 22.8% from 25 to 44, 21.1% from 45 to 64, and 19.2% who were 65 years of age or older. The median age was 38 years. For every 100 females, there were 77.3 males. For every 100 females age 18 and over, there were 71.5 males.

The median income for a household in the town was $23,984, and the median income for a family was $31,176. Males had a median income of $26,814 versus $19,224 for females. The per capita income for the town was $12,184. About 16.4% of families and 22.8% of the population were below the poverty line, including 29.6% of those under age 18 and 21.6% of those age 65 or over.

Haitian immigration wave
Between 2010 and 2012, as many as 3,000 Haitians, from toddlers to grandmothers, have settled in and around Mount Olive. Their arrival seemed to happen overnight; the 2010 census counted no Haitians in that area. The newcomers' lure: the Butterball turkey processing plant and a handful of other meat producers within commuting distance of Mount Olive.

Jim Johnson, a professor at the Kenan-Flagler Business School at University of North Carolina at Chapel Hill, said the new wave of Haitians in Eastern North Carolina is the classic immigrant labor story. "The jobs at Butterball are what we can call 3D: dirty, difficult and dangerous," Johnson said. "Nobody wants to do them, and the immigrants fill the gap."

Pickles
The Mt. Olive Pickle Company, established in 1926, is located on the corner of Cucumber and Vine streets.

The North Carolina Pickle Festival is held the last full weekend of April each year. The annual celebration is put on by both the community of Mount Olive and the Mt. Olive Pickle Company.

On New Year's Eve, the  Mt. Olive Pickle Company celebrates in unusual fashion by dropping a three-foot pickle down a flagpole into a pickle tank. However, instead of midnight local time, the drop takes place at 7 p.m. The event first took place on New Year's Eve 1999.

Area landscape
Mount Olive is part of the Atlantic coastal plain.

Education
Education in Mount Olive is administered by the Wayne County Public Schools system. Schools located in the town include Carver Elementary School and Mount Olive Middle School. On the outskirts of town is Southern Wayne High School in Dudley. Higher education is offered through Wayne Community College in Goldsboro and the private, liberal arts institution University of Mount Olive.

Transportation

Passenger
 Air: Mount Olive is served through Mount Olive Municipal Airport for corporate and general aviation aircraft and nearby Kinston Regional Jetport  with service to Orlando, Florida. Raleigh-Durham International Airport is the closest major airport with service to more than 45 domestic and international destinations. 
 Interstate Highway: I-40 is the closest Interstate to Mount Olive, which is located 9 miles south near Faison.
 Mount Olive is not served directly by passenger trains. The closest Amtrak station is located in Selma.
 Bus: The area is served by Greyhound with a location in nearby Goldsboro.

Roads
 The main highways in Mount Olive are US 117 and NC 55.

Notable people
 Morrie Aderholt, former MLB player
 Leora Jones, former handball player who competed in the 1984 Summer Olympics, 1988 Summer Olympics, and 1992 Summer Olympics
 Greg Warren, former NFL long snapper and 2x Super Bowl champion with the Pittsburgh Steelers

References

External links
 Town of Mount Olive official website
 Mount Olive Tribune

Towns in Duplin County, North Carolina
Towns in Wayne County, North Carolina
Towns in North Carolina